Sarpam is a 1979 Indian Malayalam-language film,  directed by Baby and produced by Dhanya. The film stars Vidhubala, Prem Nazir, Jayan, Jagathy Sreekumar and Kaviyoor Ponnamma. The film has musical score by K. J. Joy.

Plot
Ramesh is married to a traditional woman Latha who esteems snakes very much. Ramesh's friend James is courting a firebrand, Daisy and tries to impress her with his bravery and derring-do. But she's disgusted by his arrogance and inclination to pick fights. Their fights come to point when Daisy's pet python breaks James's hand as he harasses her. Daisy's father -a scientist experimenting with snake venom- is delighted with James's courtship of his daughter.He advises both of them. A sheepish James is told to behave like a human being and not like an animal. Daisy's father apprises her of James's loveless family background and tasks her with treating him kindly. James apologizes to Daisy and she decides to forgive him after observing his conduct for a while and deciding that the apology is genuine. She agrees to James's proposal. No sooner do they realize that their mutual friends Ramesh and Latha are in danger from Ramesh's uncle and rushes over to help Ramesh after they discover his house burned and him getting beaten up by his uncle's goons. However it is left to the snakes to enact the final revenge.

Cast

Prem Nazir as Ramesh
Jayan as James
Seema as Daisy
Vidhubala as Latha
Jagathy Sreekumar as Stephen
Kaviyoor Ponnamma as Bhavani
Jose Prakash as Dr. Fernandez
Prathapachandran as Ramesh's uncle, father
Ravikumar as  Shamsu
Bhavani as Saheera
Sukumari as Saheera's mother

Soundtrack
The music was composed by K. J. Joy and the lyrics were written by Bichu Thirumala.

References

External links
 

1979 films
1970s Malayalam-language films
Films scored by K. J. Joy
Films directed by Baby (director)